This is a list of Boise State Broncos football players in the NFL draft.

Key

Selections

References

Boise State

Boise State Broncos NFL draft